Therry Brunner (born 6 September 1975) is a Swiss former snowboarder. He competed at the 2002 Winter Olympics and the 2006 Winter Olympics.

References

External links
 

1975 births
Living people
Swiss male snowboarders
Olympic snowboarders of Switzerland
Snowboarders at the 2002 Winter Olympics
Snowboarders at the 2006 Winter Olympics
People from Dielsdorf District
Sportspeople from the canton of Zürich
21st-century Swiss people